Mattie Donnelly is an Irish sportsperson. He plays hurling with the Antrim senior inter-county hurling team. On 29 May 2011, he made his championship debut against Wexford in the 2011 All-Ireland Senior Hurling Championship, coming on as a substitute in a 3-16 to 1-11 defeat.

References

Year of birth missing (living people)
Living people
Antrim inter-county hurlers
Ballycastle McQuillan hurlers